The souravli (Cretan Greek: θιαμπόλι thiamboli, or φιαμπόλι fiamboli; Cypriot Greek: πιθκιαύλιν "pithkiavlin") is a Greek folk instrument, a type of a fipple flute made of reed or wood. It has a 2 octave ambitus. 

A double flute is called a disavli (δισαύλι), one with no holes and the other one having holes to play the melody. 

In Cyclades, the souravli is very widespread, especially in the Greek island of Naxos.

See also
Greek musical instruments
Cretan lyra
Naxos

References
Traditional Greek instruments
Musipedia: Σουραύλι
Musipedia: Θιαμπόλι

Greek musical instruments
Fipple flutes